Michal Lamdani (born December 5, 1944), also Michal Lamdani-Cohen, is and Israeli former Olympic high jumper, eight-time Israeli champion, and former Maccabiah Games gold medal winner.

She was born in Israel, and is Jewish.

High jumping career
Lamdani was the Israeli Women's high jump champion in 1960-66, and in 1968 (as Michal Cohen), with a best jump of 3.65 metres.

Lamdani competed for Israel at the 1964 Summer Olympics in Tokyo, Japan, at the age of 19. In the Women's High Jump she tied for 19th out of 26 competitors, with a best height cleared of 1.65 metres. When she competed in the Olympics, she was 5-7.5 (172 cm) tall and weighed 141 lbs (64 kg).

She competed for Israel at the 1965 Maccabiah Games, winning a gold medal in the high jump.

References 

Living people
Israeli Jews
Jewish female athletes (track and field)
Athletes (track and field) at the 1964 Summer Olympics
Maccabiah Games medalists in athletics
1944 births
Israeli female high jumpers
Olympic athletes of Israel
Maccabiah Games gold medalists for Israel
Competitors at the 1965 Maccabiah Games